Frank S. Niceley (born March 3, 1947) is a Republican member of the Tennessee State Senate representing the 8th district, consisting of Claiborne, Grainger, Hancock, Hawkins, Jefferson and Union counties.

Niceley had previously served in the Tennessee House of Representatives. In the House, he represented District 17, which encompassed portions of Knox County and the majority of Jefferson County.

Early life, education, and career
Niceley is a native of Knox County and of the district he served in the state House of Representatives. He was raised around agriculture.  After graduating from Jefferson High School, Niceley attended the University of Tennessee, where he received a bachelor's degree in soil science in 1969. Subsequently, he and his wife, Cyndie, moved their residence to neighboring Jefferson County, where he began his career as a farmer and businessman.

Tennessee House of Representatives
Niceley served in the Tennessee House from 1988 to 1992 (96th and 97th Tennessee General Assemblies). He was elected again in 2004 to serve in the 104th General Assembly, and won re-election in 2006 and 2008 to serve in the 105th and 106th General Assemblies.  During his time as a State Representative, he has been a member of the House Agriculture Committee, the House Conservation and Environment Committee, House Environment Subcommittee, and the House Parks and Tourism Subcommittee.

Locally, Niceley serves with the Farm Bureau, which enables financial services to farmers, and the National Rifle Association.

Niceley has argued against making cockfighting a felony in Tennessee and helped defeat a bill that would have increased the $50 fine for cockfighting to $2,500, saying that cockfighting is a cultural tradition. He said: "They pay their taxes. They're not bothering anybody. I don't know what the big deal is." He also noted that cockfighting brings in tourist dollars from other states. "They buy food, they stay in hotels, they buy gas," he said.

Statements and controversies

2009 
In 2009, Niceley was one of four Republican members of the Tennessee House to announce plans to join a legal action to force President Barack Obama to release his birth certificate and prove his citizenship.

2012 
During a Tennessee House committee hearing in February 2012, Niceley declared that coyotes had been introduced to Tennessee by the Tennessee Wildlife Resources Agency (TWRA) for purpose of controlling the wild deer population, but had subsequently become pests that attack livestock. This allegation was investigated by PolitiFact Tennessee. PolitiFact determined that coyotes had arrived in the state naturally, without any involvement by the TWRA. Stating that Niceley had repeated an "urban myth" that had been debunked previously, PolitiFact characterized his statement as a "real howler" and categorized it as "Pants On Fire", indicating a statement that "is not accurate and makes a ridiculous claim".

2017 
Niceley rejects mainstream views of climate science. At a December 2017 meeting of the American Legislative Exchange Council (ALEC), he told E&E News reporter Zack Colman: "I think the whole premise that carbon dioxide is a pollutant is flawed. It's not a pollutant, it's just as natural as oxygen. The trees and plants depend on CO2 just the same way we depend on oxygen."

2022
While speaking in favor of a bill that would make camping on any public property punishable by a $50 fine, Niceley cited Adolf Hitler as an example of someone who worked his way out of homelessness to "lead a life that got him in the history books."

References

External links
Rep. Frank S. Niceley, Tennessee General Assembly web site
Frank Nicely said, What?, Frank S. Niceley's blog
Sen. Frank Niceley, Twitter account

1947 births
University of Tennessee alumni
Living people
Republican Party members of the Tennessee House of Representatives
Republican Party Tennessee state senators
21st-century American politicians